

Below is a list of Delft Blue houses that KLM has presented to all of its World Business Class passengers since the 1950s. Until 1994 the houses were issued irregularly. Since 1994, a new house has been presented each year on October 7, the anniversary of KLM's founding in 1919.

Collector’s items

 Frans Hals Museum, Groot Heiligland 62, Haarlem - 1962
 Royal Palace, Nieuwezijds Voorburgwal 147, Amsterdam - first issue 1986
 De Waag (‘The Weigh House’), Markt 35, Gouda - first issue 1997
 House of Bols, Paulus Potterstraat 14, Amsterdam - 2007
 Ridderzaal (‘Hall of Knights’), Binnenhof 10, The Hague - 2008
 Huis ter Kleef, Kleverlaan 9, Haarlem - 2009
 Concertgebouw, Concertgebouwplein 1, Amsterdam - 2014
 Carré Theatre, Amstel 115–125, Amsterdam - 2014
 Het Loo Palace, Koninklijk Park 1, Apeldoorn - 2014
 Nederlands Scheepvaartmuseum (National Maritime Museum), Kattenburgerplein 1, Amsterdam - 2016

Collection

See also
 KLM (section Delft Blue houses)
 Canals of Amsterdam

References

Air France–KLM
KLM
Tourist attractions in the Netherlands Antilles